Ridgeview Public Library is a historic former library located at Hickory, Catawba County, North Carolina.  It was built in 1951, and is a one-story, brick veneer building with Colonial Revival-style design elements. It was moved to its present location in 1998, when it was replaced with the new Ridgeview Branch Library.  The library was constructed to serve the African-American neighborhood of Ridgeview.

It was listed on the National Register of Historic Places in 2011.

References

African-American history of North Carolina
Libraries on the National Register of Historic Places in North Carolina
Library buildings completed in 1951
Colonial Revival architecture in North Carolina
Buildings and structures in Catawba County, North Carolina
National Register of Historic Places in Catawba County, North Carolina
1951 establishments in North Carolina